Kumla Prison is a prison facility in Kumla Municipality, Sweden. It was opened in 1965 and is Sweden's biggest prison. Kumla is one of three high security prisons in Sweden holding risk inmates (security class 1). On March 18, 2009, a new supermax facility was opened inside the Kumla Prison.

Notable inmates
Jackie Arklov
Clark Olofsson
Christer Pettersson
Lars-Inge Svartenbrandt
Rakhmat Akilov
John Ausonius
Stig Bergling
Helge Fossmo
Daniel Maiorana
Mijailo Mijailović
Jon Nödtveidt
Tony Olsson
Rahmi Sahindal
Tommy Zethraeus
Miro Barešić

References 
 

Kumla
Kumla Municipality
Buildings and structures in Örebro County